The Estadio Rafael Mendoza Castellón is a multi-purpose stadium in the neighborhood of Achumani, La Paz, Bolivia. It is currently used mostly for football matches and belongs to The Strongest. The stadium has a capacity of 14,000 people. 

The name was chosen in homage to Rafael Mendoza Castillo (1924-2002), historical president of the club. The stadium was inaugurated on 16 July 1986 with a match between The Strongest and Club Bolivar.

References

External links 
 Estadio Rafael Mendoza Castellón at Soccerway

Rafael Mendoza
Rafael Mendoza
The Strongest
Buildings and structures in La Paz Department (Bolivia)
Rafael Mendoza